The Pra River is a river of Ghana. Part of the area between the Pra and Anum rivers forms the Pra Anum Forest Reserve.

References

Rivers of Ghana